Survivor South Africa: Santa Carolina is the third season of the South African reality game show Survivor South Africa. The season was filmed in late 2009 and aired weekly between January and April 2010 on Wednesdays nights on M-Net with the ninety-minute live season finale airing on the 21, April 2010. M-Net also commissioned a 15th episode that had a look at the whole series with retrospective views from all the contestants. Hosted by Nico Panagio (replacing previous host Mark Bayly), the program featured 18 celebrity castaways competing for 27 days. The grand prize was a R500,000 donation to the winner's chosen charity and an additional R500,000 for the winner.

The season was filmed on the small island of Santa Carolina, a member of the Bazaruto Archipelago off the southern coast of Mozambique. The castaways lived amongst white sand beaches, coral reefs and buildings left abandoned by the Mozambican Civil War, including a prison and a luxury hotel.

This season also introduced Exile Island, Tribal Kidnapping and the Hidden Immunity Idol twists, which were imported from the American edition of the show. The Hidden Immunity Idol twist was much like the first iteration of the twist (as seen in Survivor: Guatemala) in which the idol had to be played prior to the voting process.

On 21 April, it was revealed that exotic dancer and club owner Perle "GiGi" van Schalkwyk was crowned the Ultimate Survivor in a 6–3 decision over television presenter Ashley Hayden, winning R500,000 for herself and another R500,000 for her charity, a Hospice in Johannesburg.

Contestants 

Divided into two different groups, the first group of celebrities marooned on Day 1 had to exile two of their own (they chose Kaseran and Craig) while a smaller group of celebrities were marooned on a second beach. Day 2 saw Kaseran and Craig perform a schoolyard pick of the 18 celebrities and form two tribes: Chibudu and Timbila, after local Chopi words for "harmony" and "togetherness" respectively. After a cycle of exiles and temporary tribal kidnappings, Day 13 saw each tribe kidnap a member from the opposing tribe. Day 15 saw the 10 remaining contestants merge into the Kululama (meaning "strength") tribe. Alongside the jury, South Africa were given a public poll to reward one of the two finalists the audience's jury vote.

Season summary
Day 1 saw the celebrities marooned on various beaches off the coast of Mozambique, with the larger group exiling Kaseran and Craig once they were introduced to the new host, Nico Panagio. Day 2 saw the entire cast be divided into two tribes: Chibudu and Timbila; with Kaseran and Craig performing a schoolyard pick. Chibudu were plagued with two tribe members quitting days apart, and they were also forced to vote out their strongest member due to an injury at the beginning of the game. However, they overcame the odds against the larger Timbila tribe in a majority of the challenges under the leadership of Okkert. Timbila saw a core alliance form between Ashley and Kaseran, controlling vote after vote to pick off non-alliance members.

At the merge, the original alliances were tied with 5 members each, with a tiebreaker challenge shifting the balance in favour of the Timbila alliance. However, cross-tribal relationships that formed between Izak and Okkert led to the Timbila alliance losing Louw and their majority at the next vote, due to a vote countback system in the event of tie votes. A reward challenge win by the three remaining women in the game, Ashley, GiGi, and Sade, saw a second cross-tribal alliance form; Sade and GiGi in the Chibudu alliance would vote for future targets, while Ashley's Timbila alliance would force ties to systematically eliminate as many of the physically stronger men in both alliances.

This protected all three women and Ashley's closest ally Kaseran until the final five, when Ashley had to betray the comedian for her women's alliance. At the final four, the women's alliance turned on Sade for being the youngest and strongest player left, and Ashley won a record-breaking fifth consecutive immunity challenge to secure a spot in the final two. She voted out the last remaining man in the competition, the rapper ProVerb, over the quiet former Exotic Dancer and businesswoman, GiGi. The Final Tribal Council saw the jury at odds with Ashley's deceptive strategy, with Louw and Kaseran taking Ashley's betrayals to heart. After the votes were cast, the South African audience were given an opportunity to vote for either Ashley or GiGi to receive the public's jury vote. At the reunion, while South Africa voted for Ashley, it was revealed that the jury respected GiGi's underestimated social game over Ashley's ruthless strategic prowess. Thus, GiGi was awarded the title of Ultimate Survivor in a 6–3 vote and split the grand prize with the charity of her choice. During the reunion, both Kaseran and Louw stated they no longer held resentment towards Ashley since returning to South Africa after production had ended.

Episodes

Voting history

References

External links
Official Site

Survivor South Africa seasons
Television shows filmed in Mozambique
2010 South African television seasons